Miksa Bondi (8 May 1918 – 11 August 1997) was a Hungarian boxer. He competed in the men's flyweight event at the 1948 Summer Olympics. At the 1948 Summer Olympics, he lost to Ron Gower of Australia.

References

1918 births
1997 deaths
Hungarian male boxers
Olympic boxers of Hungary
Boxers at the 1948 Summer Olympics
Boxers from Budapest
Flyweight boxers